Sarah Bolton is an American physicist and university administrator who currently serves as the president of Whitman College in Walla Walla, Washington. She assumed this position on July 1, 2022. Bolton has been a strong supporter of Dreamers, students who are undocumented but born in the United States, Posse scholars, a program to "empower diverse groups of leaders who transform communities, this country and the world," and international students, especially when many could not return home during the COVID-19 pandemic.

Prior to her tenure at Whitman, Bolton was president of the College of Wooster in Wooster, Ohio from 2016 to 2022, as well as dean and professor of physics at Williams College in Williamstown, Massachusetts from 1995 to 2016.

Education
Bolton received her B.S. in physics and biophysics from Brown University in 1988, and her Masters and PhD from the University of California, Berkeley, in Physics. Her doctoral thesis is titled "Dimensionality dependence of indium gallium arsenide nonlinear optical response."

Career
Bolton came to Williams College as an assistant professor of physics in 1995, was promoted to associate professor in 2001, and full professor in 2007. She served as chair of the physics department from 2007 to 2010. She won Williams College's Outstanding Mentor Award for Fostering Inclusive Academic Excellence in 2009.

Bolton served for more than two decades as dean of the college and professor of physics at Williams College in Williamstown, Massachusetts. As dean of the college at Williams, Bolton supervised academic advising and supported programs such as off-campus study, international student services, and the registrar's office. She was also active in creating policies and procedures for sexual assault prevention and response. In addition, she worked on projects addressing first-generation college students, and on efforts toward equity and inclusion on Williams’ campus.

Research and scholarship 
Bolton's research and scholarship explores the properties of novel, nanostructured materials, which have features made up of only a few atomic layers. She uses ultrafast pulsed lasers to investigate the ways that energy is transferred in these quantum mechanical systems. She has published in physics journals such as Physical Review A and Physical Review B.

References 

Year of birth missing (living people)
Living people
American women academics
Heads of universities and colleges in the United States
Women heads of universities and colleges
Brown University alumni
UC Berkeley College of Letters and Science alumni
21st-century American women scientists